Trigonulina is a genus of small carnivorous bivalves in the family Verticordiidae. Species in the genus are known for the unique round formations on the surface of their shells.

Species 
 Trigonulina novemcostata (A. Adams & Reeve, 1850)
 Trigonulina ornata (d'Orbigny, 1853)

References 

Bivalve genera
Verticordiidae
Taxa described in 1853
Taxa named by Alcide d'Orbigny